Johannes Theodor "Theo" Bücker (born 10 July 1948) is a German football manager and a former player, who is the current coach of the under-15 team of Lebanese club Athletico SC.

Coaching career

Return to Lebanon 
On 8 August 2011, Bücker was announced as Lebanon's head coach, with the former national team manager taking over the reins ten years after leaving the position. He is the first ever coach to bring Lebanon to the fourth and final qualifying round of the FIFA World Cup. During this period, the Lebanese national team made impressive results. They defeated the United Arab Emirates 3–1 in Beirut, South Korea 2–1 in Beirut, and Kuwait 1–0 in Kuwait in the third round. For the first time in their history, Lebanon defeated Iran by a single goal on matchday 4 of the final round. Bücker announced his retirement in May 2013, effective from 11 June 2013, after a match that saw his side defeated by Iran 4–0.

Nejmeh 
On 18 December 2017, Bücker was re-appointed head coach of Lebanese Premier League club Nejmeh, following his spell during the 2013–14 season where he won a league title. Nejmeh finished the 2017–18 season as runners-up.

Ahli Sarba 
In 2018 Bücker became the coach of Lebanese Second Division club Ahli Sarba, staying at the club during their relegation to the Third Division.

Athletico SC 
On 6 July 2020, Bücker was appointed coach of the under-15 team of Athletico SC.

Personal life
Bücker considers himself as "half-Lebanese" and is married to a Lebanese woman. He has been a resident of Beirut for many years, expressing his love for his adopted nation.

In 2012, former Lebanon national team member Buddy Farah stated that the credit for Lebanon's success and improvement should go to Bücker and that he was the best thing ever to happen to Lebanese football.

Honours

Manager 
Individual
 Lebanese Premier League Best Coach: 2001–02, 2013–14

References

External links
 

1948 births
Living people
People from Hochsauerlandkreis
Sportspeople from Arnsberg (region)
Footballers from North Rhine-Westphalia
German footballers
Association football midfielders
Borussia Dortmund players
MSV Duisburg players
Ittihad FC players
FC Schalke 04 players
Bundesliga players
2. Bundesliga players
Saudi Professional League players
German football managers
Kazma SC managers
SV Meppen managers
Lebanon national football team managers
Sagesse SC football managers
Zamalek SC managers
Ismaily SC managers
Kuwait SC managers
Al-Wehda Club (Mecca) managers
Al-Ahli Saudi FC managers
Al Masry SC managers
Al Ahed FC managers
Ettifaq FC managers
Nejmeh SC managers
Dibba Club managers
Emirates Club managers
AC Tripoli managers
Ahli Sarba SC managers
Kuwait Premier League managers
Lebanese Premier League managers
Egyptian Premier League managers
Saudi Professional League managers
UAE Pro League managers
Lebanese Second Division managers
German expatriate footballers
German expatriate football managers
German expatriate sportspeople in Saudi Arabia
German expatriate sportspeople in Kuwait
German expatriate sportspeople in Lebanon
German expatriate sportspeople in Egypt
German expatriate sportspeople in Libya
German expatriate sportspeople in the United Arab Emirates
Expatriate footballers in Saudi Arabia
Expatriate football managers in Kuwait
Expatriate football managers in Lebanon
Expatriate football managers in Egypt
Expatriate football managers in Saudi Arabia
Expatriate football managers in Libya
Expatriate football managers in the United Arab Emirates